Phong or Tày Poọng is a Vietic dialect cluster spoken in north-central Vietnam. Varieties include Đan Lai, Toum, and Liha.

References

Vietic languages
Languages of Vietnam
Endangered Austroasiatic languages